Mahindra Blues Festival (MBF) is an annual blues music festival that happens in February at Mehboob Studios, Bandra, Mumbai. Living legends of the genre who have performed here at this festival over the past years include Buddy Guy, Walter Trout, and John Mayall.

History 
Spearheaded by Anand Mahindra, Vice-Chairman and Managing Director of the Mahindra Group, with VG Jairaman, the co-founder of Oranjuice Entertainment serving as festival director, the inaugural edition of the Mahindra Blues festival took place on 5-6 February 2011, at Mumbai's Mehboob Studios. This first edition of the festival was headlined by Chicago Blues legend Buddy Guy who is reported to have pledged his support to the endeavor without hesitation. At the culmination of his two-hour-long set, he invited the other musicians who had performed across the two days to join him on stage for an impromptu jam. Since then, the festival is closed each year with an all-star jam featuring that year's headlining artists. 

Although the festival has attracted a number of prominent blues musicians and legends over the years, Buddy Guy remains an integral part of the festival. He has headlined several editions of the festival, including its 10th anniversary in 2020. One of the festival venue's three stages has also been named the "Polka Dot Parlour" in honor of the musician's iconic polka dotted guitar and shirts. 

Apart from the international musicians who grace the stage each year, local stalwarts including Blackstratblues and Soulmate are regular features on the lineup. 

In 2015, for its fifth edition, the Mahindra Blues Festival inaugurated a new tradition - the Mahindra Blues Band Hunt. This annual competition recognizes local talent. The winners of the Band Hunt are given the opportunity to perform at the Garden Stage between the headlining sets in that year's edition of the festival. 

In 2020, for the festival's 10th anniversary, Oranjuice Entertainment teamed up with the Indian NGO Nanhi Kali for their "Blues in Schools initiative. The Mahindra Blues team taught school girls from underprivileged backgrounds how to play the harmonica. 11 of these students were chosen to perform at the festival at the Garden Stage.

Performers

References

External links

Blues festivals in Asia
Music festivals in India
Annual events in India